Borckenhagen is a surname. Notable people with the surname include:

Carl Borckenhagen (1852–1898), South African journalist and political leader 
Ludwig Borckenhagen (1850–1917), German admiral

German-language surnames